Ilektra Maria Psouni (born 12 September 1985) is a water polo player from Greece. She was part of the Greece women's national water polo team awarded the gold medal at the 2011 World Championship which took place in Shanghai in July 2011. She also competed in the 2013 World Aquatics Championships.

See also
 List of world champions in women's water polo
 List of World Aquatics Championships medalists in water polo

References

External links
 

Greek female water polo players
Living people
Olympiacos Women's Water Polo Team players
Place of birth missing (living people)
World Aquatics Championships medalists in water polo
1985 births
21st-century Greek women